The following outline is provided as an overview of and topical guide to ants:

Ants – social insects with geniculate (elbowed) antennae and a distinctive node-like structure that forms a slender waist.  Ants are of the family Formicidae and evolved from wasp-like ancestors in the mid-Cretaceous period between 110 and 130 million years ago, diversifying after the rise of flowering plants. More than 12,500 out of an estimated total of 22,000 species have been classified.

Essence of ants 

 Ant colony
 Myrmecology – scientific study of ants

Biological classification 

 Kingdom: Animalia
 Phylum: Arthropoda
 Class: Insecta
 Order: Hymenoptera
 Suborder: Apocrita
 Superfamily: Vespoidea
 Family: Formicidae (family authority: Latreille, 1809)

Kinds of ants 

Ant
 List of ant genera
 List of ants of Great Britain

Subfamilies 
Extant subfamilies
Agroecomyrmecinae
Amblyoponinae
Aneuretinae
Dolichoderinae
Dorylinae
Ectatomminae
Formicinae
Heteroponerinae
Leptanillinae
Martialinae
Myrmeciinae
Myrmicinae
Paraponerinae
Ponerinae
Proceratiinae
Pseudomyrmecinae

Fossil subfamilies
†Armaniinae (sometimes treated as the family Armaniidae within the superfamily Formicoidea)
†Brownimeciinae
†Formiciinae
†Sphecomyrminae

General myrmecology concepts

Myrmecologists 

 Murray S. Blum (1929–2015)
 Barry Bolton
 Horace Donisthorpe (1870–1951)
 Auguste Forel (1848–1931)
 William Gould (1715–1799)
 Bert Hölldobler (born 1936)
 Thomas C. Jerdon (1811–1872)
 Sir John Lubbock (1st Lord and Baron Avebury) (1834–1913)
 Derek Wragge Morley (1920–1969)
 Frederick Smith (1805–1879)
 John Obadiah Westwood (1805–1893)
 William Morton Wheeler (1865–1937)
 E.O. Wilson (1929–2021)

External links 

 
Ants
Ants
Myrmecology
Myrmecology